"Cavatina" is a 1970 classical guitar piece by British composer Stanley Myers written for the film The Walking Stick (1970), and popularised as the theme from The Deer Hunter some eight years later. The Italian musical term cavatina is frequently applied to any simple, melodious air.

History
 In this form, it was first used for the film The Walking Stick (1970), and first released on Williams' 1971 album Changes. In 1973, Cleo Laine wrote lyrics and recorded the song as "He Was Beautiful", accompanied by Williams.

After the release of The Deer Hunter in 1978, Williams' instrumental version became a UK Top 20 hit in 1979. Two other versions also made the Top 20 in the same year: another instrumental recording by The Shadows, with an electric guitar played by Hank Marvin, released on their album String of Hits with the name "Theme from 'The Deer Hunter' (Cavatina)" (number 9 in the UK singles charts and number 1 in The Netherlands); and a vocal version (using Cleo Laine's lyrics) by Iris Williams.

Later recordings

In 1982, guitarist Liona Boyd included it in her "Best Of" Collection, also with arrangement alongside Eric Robertson and Williams.

Angel Romero recorded a version of "Cavatina" on his 1988 Telarc release A Touch of Class.

Cantabile - the London Quartet recorded a Neil Richardson arrangement with Brass Quintet accompaniment of "She Was Beautiful" for their 1992 album "A Tribute to Hollywood"

Norbert Kraft included a version of "Cavatina" on his 1996 Naxos Records release "Guitar Favourites".

The tune was recorded in 2004 by trumpeter and flugelhorn player Vaughn Nark on his album Panorama: Trumpet Prism for Summit Records, featuring Nark on flugelhorn and Rick Whitehead on classical guitar.

The tune was recorded by Paul Potts on his 2007 debut album, One Chance.

There is a gospel version set to "Cavatina" called "Beautiful"; the author is Billy Evmur and it appears in the Dove on a Distant Oak Tree collection. Another vocal version with different lyrics was recorded by Vince Hill (released on the compilation The Ember Records Story Vol. 2 – 1960–1979).

In 2009, the song was the tenth track of Camilla Kerslake's début album Camilla Kerslake.

In 2011, the song was recorded by singer Joe McElderry and guitarist Miloš Karadaglić for McElderry's second album, Classic.

A full version of Cavatina for solo guitar and symphony orchestra was broadcast by the Faroese Broadcasting Company in 2013. Featuring guitarist Ólavur Jakobsen and Faroe Island Symphony Orchestra.

In 2013, the song was recorded by Mark Vincent for his album Songs from the Heart.

In 2016, the song was recorded and released by Japanese guitarist Kaori Muraji on her Decca Records album Rhapsody Japan.

Guitarist Karin Schaupp and baritone Teddy Tahu Rhodes recorded "She Was Beautiful" for the ABC Classics album I'll Walk Beside You (2018).

Other usage
Williams played the piece for the Amnesty International benefit concert, film and soundtrack The Secret Policeman's Ball in 1979.

The piece is played at the end of the Battlestar Galactica episode "Scar" after Kara "Starbuck" Thrace toasts the memory of pilots who had been tragically killed doing what they loved. See also .

"Cavatina" was used to accompany "The Gallery" in the BBC children's programme Take Hart, and its predecessor Vision On, during the 1970s. It was also used for some time in the 1970s as the closedown music when BBC Radio ceased transmission at 2 a.m.

The song was featured in the 2005 film Jarhead.

References

External links
 Lyrics for "He Was Beautiful"

1970s instrumentals
Compositions for guitar
1970 compositions